The William Pitt Debating Union (WPDU) is the debating society of the University of Pittsburgh.  Falling under the auspices of the Department of Communication, the WPDU is a co-curricular program and hub for a wide range of debating activities, including intercollegiate policy debate, public debate, and debate outreach. One of the oldest collegiate debating organizations in the nation, the WPDU grew from the University’s Division of Public Speaking in 1912. Throughout its history, the WPDU has regularly participated in national and international competitions, including capturing the affirmative team two-man debate national championship at the 1947 Grand National Forensic Tournament, and appearing 45 times at the National Debate Tournament (through 2019), where it captured the 1981 national championship. The WPDU is located in the heart Pitt's campus and is housed on the fourteenth floor of the Cathedral of Learning. The WPDU also offers scholarships to top team participants.

Competitions

The WPDU has participated in, and traveled extensively to intercollegiate debate competitions since its early history. A regular participant regional and national competitions, the WPDU has previously won the Pennsylvania State Debating Championship, qualified for the National Debate Tournament forty-five times, and captured the 1981 National Debate Tournament national championship. In addition, at the 1947 Grand National Forensic Tournament, a two-man affirmative debate team won the national championship competing against 89 other teams, while Pitt's negative team finished as runners-up.  The WPDU has also finished first in the American Debate Association’s varsity rankings and its debaters have won hundreds of individual speaking awards. In the past the WPDU hosted major intercollegiate debating competitions, and through the years, the team has appeared on television, including once hosting its own weekly television show in the 1950s, and its success has enjoyed coverage in local and regional media.

Public Debate

Throughout its history, the WPDU has frequently convened public debates on salient and pressing topics facing local, regional and national communities, sometimes drawing large crowds and media attention. Today, these debates typically feature a mix of student and expert advocates, audience participation periods, and formats tailored specifically for each debate. Topics have included school vouchers, the merging local governments, and transportation issues, peer-to-peer file sharing, textbook pricing, and sex education. In 2000, the Cross Examination Debate Association recognized the Union’s public debate efforts with the Public Sphere Award.

International Debate
The Union regularly hosts foreign national teams on their debating tours of the United States, having entertained the British, Japanese, Russian and Irish national teams, and has also traveled for international debates. In 2000, the WPDU hosted a public debate between the national high school select teams from New Zealand and South Africa. From 2001-2006, WPDU coaches worked with the U.S. State Department to teach the public debate process as a strategy of civil society empowerment to high school students from Albania, Kosovo, Serbia, Romania, Macedonia and Montenegro.

Outreach
The WPDU has a long history of outreach exemplified by its history of hosting high school debate clinics and tournaments as far back as at least the 1930s. Since 1995, the WPDU has reached thousands of elementary and secondary school students through its outreach initiatives, including the College in High School Argument program and the Middle School Public Debate Program.

Coaches
The WPDU employs two full-time directors and numerous graduate teaching assistants working with debate therefore making it one of the largest and most experienced debating coaching staffs in the United States. The current WPDU faculty includes the following:

Current
Director of the William Pitt Debating Union: Calum Matheson 2015–Present
Director of Debate: Eric English 2015–Present

Former Directors of Debate
Robert P. Newman - 1952 to 1967
Thomas Kane - 1967 to 1990
Arnie Madsen - 1990 to 1994
Gordon Mitchell, 1995-2007
Shanara Reid-Brinkley, 2007-2015

Former Coaches
Matt Brigham, Matt Gayetsky, Taylor Hahn, Amber Kelsie, Odile Hobeika, Joseph Packer, Sydney Pasquinelli, John Rief, Brent Saindon

Related
 : Cambridge Union Society
 : Oxford Union Society
 : The Durham Union Society
 : London School of Economics, Grimshaw International Relations Club
 : Yale Debate Association
 : Berkeley Forum
 : Olivaint Conférence
 : Olivaint Conference of Belgium
 : Debattierclub Stuttgart
 : Common Sense Society Budapest
 : Queen's Debating Union

References

External links
William Pitt Debating Union homepage
William Pitt Debating Union streaming media site

Student debating societies
University of Pittsburgh